
Pleszew County is a unit of territorial administration and local government (powiat) in Greater Poland Voivodeship, west-central Poland. It came into being on January 1, 1999, as a result of the Polish local government reforms passed in 1998.

As of 2006 its total population is 61,951, out of which the population of Pleszew is 17,787 and the rural population is 44,164.

Neighbouring counties
Pleszew County is bordered by Września County and Słupca County to the north, Konin County to the north-east, the city of Kalisz and Kalisz County to the south-east, Ostrów Wielkopolski County to the south, Krotoszyn County to the south-west, and Jarocin County to the west.

Administrative divisions
The county is subdivided into six gminas (three urban-rural and three rural). These are listed in the following table, in descending order of population.

References

 
Pleszew